Carried Away is a 2009 film written and directed by Tom Huckabee, starring Gabriel Horn, Juli Erickson, Mark Walters, Bryan Massey, and Tyler Corie.

The film follows Ed Franklin (Horn) as he liberates his grandmother (Erickson) from a nursing home and takes her from Fort Worth, Texas across country on their way to Hollywood.  In pursuit are his father (Walters) and two brothers (Massey, Corie) who are determined to get her back. Ed soon realizes that his grandmother suffers from mental illness.

Awards
Best Feature Film - Oxford Film Festival (Mississippi)
Best Feature Film - Da Vinci Film Festival

Festivals
Breckenridge Festival of Film
Bare Bones International Film Festival
Crossroads Film Festival
Oxford Film Festival
DaVinci Film Festival
Byron Bay International Film Festival
Dallas International Film Festival

Confidence Bay
Carried Away was the first feature film to use the world's first mobile high-definition edit suite, Confidence Bay, during the filming process. The film was shot tapeless on the Red One and Confidence Bay transferred all the data from the camera, synchronized all audio and video, created dailies, and assembled a rough cut of the film on locations spanning Texas, Arizona, and California. A 90-minute rough cut of the film was shown to the cast and crew at the wrap of the film.

Once filming was completed, Confidence Bay parked at Dockweiler State Beach in Los Angeles, CA where the majority of the film was edited. The film was picture locked only a month after the film wrapped.

References

External links
 
 

2009 films
2009 drama films
American drama films
2000s English-language films
2000s American films